The Dutch film industry produced over one hundred feature films in 2014. This article fully lists all non-pornographic films, including short films, that had a release date in that year and which were at least partly made by the Netherlands. It does not include films first released in previous years that had release dates in 2014.  Also included is an overview of the major events in Dutch film, including film festivals and awards ceremonies, as well as lists of those films that have been particularly well received, both critically and financially.

Major Releases

Notable Deaths

See also

 2014 in film
 2014 in the Netherlands
 Cinema of the Netherlands
 List of Dutch submissions for the Academy Award for Best Foreign Language Film

References

External links

Lists of 2014 films by country or language
Films
2014